Ivanne Elliott Huitrón Álvarez (born March 7, 1983, in Monterrey, Nuevo León) is a Mexican footballer. He currently plays as a defender for C.F. Ciudad Juárez. He also played for Club Tijuana.

References

External links
Tijuana Player Bio

1983 births
Living people
Footballers from Nuevo León
C.F. Monterrey players
Club Tijuana footballers
Sportspeople from Monterrey
Association football defenders
Mexican footballers